Margaretta Mitchell (née Kuhlthau, born May 27, 1935) is an American photographer and writer who lives in Berkeley, California. As a photographer, she is known for her portraits and still lifes. She has authored art criticism, biographies of women artists, and photographic histories.

Early life

Mitchell was born May 27, 1935 in Brooklyn, New York, the second child of Conrad W. and Margaretta Kuhlthau.  After graduating magna cum laude in 1957 from Smith College, Mitchell (then Kuhlthau) served until 1959 as a research assistant to Edwin Land, who was instrumental in the invention of the Polaroid instant camera.

Work
Mitchell’s photographs belong to the Pictorialist tradition, addressing formal concerns of line and shadow primarily in black and white. She occasionally incorporates graphic media, particularly in images of flowers. Her work can be found in the collections of the Amon Carter Museum of American Art, the International Center of Photography, the Akron Art Museum, and San Francisco Museum of Modern Art, among others.

In perhaps her best-known work, Mitchell worked with the International Center of Photography in New York City in the late 1970s to mount a traveling exhibition and accompanying book on women photographers. Recollections: Ten Women of Photography included works by Berenice Abbott, Ruth Bernhard, Carlotta Corpron, Louise Dahl-Wolfe, Nell Dorr, Toni Frissell, Laura Gilpin, Lotte Jacobi, Consuelo Kanaga, and Barbara Morgan, bringing attention to the previously overlooked contributions of women to photography.

Other publications include To a Cabin with Dorothea Lange (1973), Dance for Life (1985), Flowers (1991), a biography of photographer Ruth Bernhard (2000), and The Face of Poetry (2005).

Personal life 
She and Frederick Mitchell married on May 23, 1959 in New Brunswick, New Jersey. The couple raised three daughters. Frederick Mitchell died in 1996. In 2018 she married Sim Warkov.

References

1935 births
Living people
Smith College alumni
20th-century American photographers
21st-century American photographers
Photographers from New York City
Photographers from California
Artists from Berkeley, California
21st-century American women writers
20th-century American women writers
Artists from Brooklyn
20th-century American biographers
American women biographers
Writers from Brooklyn
Writers from Berkeley, California
20th-century American women photographers
21st-century American women photographers